Anatoliy Serhiyovych Zhabchenko (born 23 February 1979) is a Ukrainian professional football referee. He has been a full international for FIFA in 2013-2017.

Due to the 2014 Russian invasion of Ukraine and annexation of Crimea, in 2014-2017 Zhabchenko represented the city of Khmelnytskyi.

During the summer of 2019, Zhabchenko was appointed as a Referee by the Russian Football Union.

References

External links
 
 
 
 
 

1979 births
Living people
Sportspeople from Simferopol
People from the Crimean Oblast
Ukrainian football referees
Ukrainian footballers
FC Dynamo Saky players
FC Dnipro-2 Dnipropetrovsk players
FC Tekstilshchik Kamyshin players
Ukraine youth international footballers
Association football goalkeepers
Russian football referees